Panchagarh Sadar is an upazila of Panchagarh District in the Division of Rangpur, Bangladesh.

Geography
It has 37232 households and total area 347.08 km2.

It is bounded by West Bengal state of India on the north and east, Boda and Debiganj upazilas on the south, Atwari and Tentulia upazilas and West Bengal state of India on the west. The upazila has two enclaves; the Indian enclaves in the upazila are Garati and Singimari.

Demographics
As of the 1991 Bangladesh census, Panchagarh Sadar has a population of 193198. Males constitute 51.3% of the population, and females 48.7%. This Upazila's eighteen up population is 92460. Panchagarh Sadar has an average literacy rate of 34.7% (7+ years), and the national average of 32.4% literate.

Administration
Panchagarh thana was established under Jalpaiguri district of West Bengal during the British rule. It was under the Thakurgaon sub-division of dinajpur district at the time of the partition of 1947 and had been a thana under Panchagarh sub-division since 1980. Panchagarh Thana was formed in 1909 and it wa s turned into an upazila in 1984.

Panchagarh Sadar Upazila is divided into Panchagarh Municipality and ten union parishads: Amarkhana, Chaklahat,  Dhakkamara, Garinabari, Hafizabad, Haribhasa, Kamat Kajal Dighi, Magura, Panchagarh, and Satmara. The union parishads are subdivided into 83 mauzas and 195 villages.

Panchagarh Municipality is subdivided into 9 wards and 32 mahallas.

See also
Upazilas of Bangladesh
Districts of Bangladesh
Divisions of Bangladesh

References

Upazilas of Panchagarh District